Hedemora Diesel is a trademark to the Swedish company Hedemora Turbo & Diesel AB in Hedemora, Dalarnas län (a county in Sweden). It is a spinoff from Hedemora Verkstäder. The company used to produce diesel engines for ships, locomotives, and oil rigs along with backup generators to hospitals. The company later shifted its focus to supply existing engines with spare parts and service.

In February 2006 Hedemora Diesel was bought by the Australian company Coote Industrial Ltd.

In February 2016 the company name was changed to Hedemora Turbo & Diesel, to include the manufacturing, design authority, parts and service supply of HS Turbochargers, that were acquired from Turbomeca in 2009.

Ships with Hedemora engines
Submarines in Sjöormen class submarine

Submarines in Västergötlands-/Södermanland class submarine

Royal Australian Navy's Collins class submarine

Locomotives with Hedemora engines
T45 - Diesel locomotive, built by ASEA. 5 st.
Experimental locomotive built by AB Motala Verkstad for LKAB mine train
Some replacement engines of TCDD DE24000

Oil rigs with Hedemora engines
Eldfisk Tor (Phillips Petroleum)
Northern Producer semi submersible operated by Enquest.

References

External links
Hedemora Diesel AB

Hedemora
Engine manufacturers of Sweden
Companies based in Dalarna County